Gilles Tremblay,  (6 September 1932 – 27 July 2017) was a Canadian composer from Quebec.

Early life and education
Trembay studied at the conservatories of Québec in Montréal and Paris (1954–61), where his teachers included Olivier Messiaen (analysis), Andrée Vaurabourg-Honegger (counterpoint), Yvonne Loriod (piano), and Maurice Martenot (inventor of the ondes Martenot). He also attended Stockhausen's summer courses at Darmstadt, where he became interested in electro-acoustic techniques.

Career
Tremblay returned to Quebec in 1961. Beginning in 1962, and for many years, he taught composition at the Conservatoire de musique du Québec à Montréal.

Early in his career he performed as a specialist on the ondes Martenot.

In 1991, he was made an Officer of the National Order of Quebec.

Tremblay died August 4, 2017, at Côte-des-Neiges–Notre-Dame-de-Grâce.

Compositions (selective list)
Mobile, for violin and piano (1962)
Champs I, for piano and 2 percussionists (1965)
Cantique de durées, for seven groups of instruments (1960)
Sonorisation du Pavillon du Québec, 24-channel electronic music (1967)
Souffles (Champs II), for 2 flutes, oboe, clarinet, horn, 2 trumpets, 2 trombones, piano, 2 percussionists, and contrabass (1968)
Vers (Champs III), for 2 flutes, clarinet, trumpet, horn, 3 percussionists, 3 violins, and contrabass (1969)
Jeux de solstices, for orchestra (1974)
Oralléluiants, for soprano, bass clarinet, horn, 2 percussionists, and 3 contrabasses (1975)
Fleuves, for piano, percussion, and orchestra (1976)
Vers le soleil, for orchestra (1978)
Le Signe du lion, for horn and tam-tam (1981)
Triojubilus "À Raphaël", for flute, harp, and cowbells (1985)
Les Vêpres de la Vierge, for soprano and orchestra (1986)
Musique du feu, for piano and orchestra (1991)
L'arbre de Borobudur, for horn, 2 harps, double bass, ondes Martenot, 2 percussionists, and gamelan ensemble (1994)
L'espace du coeur (Miron-Machaut), for mixed voices and percussion (1997)
Les pierres crieront, for cello and large orchestra (1998)
A quelle heure commence le temps?, for baritone, percussion, piano, and orchestra (1999)
L'appel de Kondiaronk: symphonie portuaire, environmental work for battle sirens and 2 locomotives (2000)
String Quartet Croissant (2001)
En partage (Concerto), for viola and orchestra (2002)
L'eau qui danse, la pomme qui chante et l'oiseau qui dit la vérité, Opéra féerie based on "The Dancing Water, the Singing Apple, and the Speaking Bird" (2009)

Writings
 1968. "Note pour Cantique de durées." Revue d'esthetique 21, nos. 2–4 ("Musiques nouvelles"): 51–58.

References

Sources
 

 

Peyser, Joan. 1976. Boulez: Composer, Conductor, Enigma. New York: Schirmer Books. ; London: Cassell. 
Villeneuve, André. 2001. "Souffles (Champs II, the Mobile, and the Musical Language of Gilles Tremblay." Ex tempore 10, no. 2 (Spring–Summer): 58–147.

Further reading
 Auzolle, Cécile. « De la résurgence du merveilleux : l'exemple de L'Eau qui danse, la Pomme qui chante et l'Oiseau qui dit la vérité, un opéra de Gilles Tremblay et Pierre Morency. » Circuit, volume 20, numéro 3, 2010, p. 9–42.

External links
 "Gilles Tremblay" by Robert Richard (2006); "Gilles Tremblay" by Alexis Luko, Rachelle Taylor, Hélène Plouffe (2008) The Canadian Encyclopedia
 "Gilles Tremblay", The Living Composers Project

1932 births
2017 deaths
Canadian composers
Canadian male composers
French Quebecers
Conservatoire de musique du Québec à Montréal alumni
Academic staff of the Conservatoire de musique du Québec à Montréal
Officers of the National Order of Quebec
Ondists
Prix Denise-Pelletier winners
Officers of the Order of Canada
Pupils of Karlheinz Stockhausen